Gervais Lake is a lake in Ramsey County, in the U.S. state of Minnesota.

Gervais Lake was named after Benjamin Gervais, a pioneer who settled at the lake in 1844.

See also
List of lakes in Minnesota

References

Lakes of Minnesota
Lakes of Ramsey County, Minnesota